Tiago da Costa Silva (born 13 April 1987 in Rio de Janeiro), known as Tiago Costa, is a Brazilian footballer who plays for Retrô Futebol Clube Brasil as a left back.

External links
Tiago Costa at playmakerstats.com (English version of ogol.com.br)

1987 births
Living people
Footballers from Rio de Janeiro (city)
Brazilian footballers
Association football defenders
Campeonato Brasileiro Série A players
Campeonato Brasileiro Série B players
Campeonato Brasileiro Série C players
Campeonato Brasileiro Série D players
Artsul Futebol Clube players
Volta Redonda FC players
Santa Cruz Futebol Clube players
Ceará Sporting Club players
Associação Chapecoense de Futebol players
Grêmio Novorizontino players
Clube Náutico Capibaribe players
Joinville Esporte Clube players